Molly B Healy is an Australian cricketer who plays as a right-handed batter and right-arm medium pace bowler. She last played for Western Australia in the Women's National Cricket League (WNCL). She made her WNCL debut on 22 September 2019 against Tasmania.

References

External links

Molly Healy at Cricket Australia

Year of birth missing (living people)
Living people
Place of birth missing (living people)
Australian women cricketers
Western Australia women cricketers